Vitaly Aleksandrovich Razdayev (born 13 October 1946, Anzhero-Sudzhensk, Kemerovo Oblast) is a Soviet football player. Master of Sports of the Soviet Union (1979). The best scorer of the Soviet First League in the history (216 goals in 555 matches).

From 1969 to 1988 he played for FC Kuzbass Kemerovo.

References

External links
 Статья «Легенды первого дивизиона» на сайте ondivision.ru

1946 births
Living people
People from Anzhero-Sudzhensk
Soviet footballers
PFC CSKA Moscow players
Association football forwards
United Russia politicians